This is a list of "traditional" windmills, which usually are gristmills, in the United States.

In this nation more than others, "windmill" is often used to refer to what are properly termed windpumps bringing up water for agriculture. This is at least partly due to usage by windpump builders Eclipse Windmill Company (1873) and Aermotor Windmill Company (1888, the sole surviving US "windmill" manufacturer). And it is also used by many to refer to modern wind turbines generating electricity.  

This list aims to include only traditional-type windmills, with the exception that it also includes NRHP-listed historic windpumps known as windmills, such as the "Iron Turbine Windmill" in Arizona.

Windmills having coordinates below may be seen together in a map: click on "Map all coordinates using OpenSourceMap" at right of this page.

Arizona

California

Florida

Illinois

Indiana

Iowa

Kansas

Maine

Massachusetts

Michigan

Minnesota

Missouri

New Jersey

New Mexico

New York

Rhode Island

South Carolina

South Dakota

Tennessee

Texas

Vermont

Virginia

Washington

Wisconsin

Insular Areas

Puerto Rico

US Virgin Islands

Notes
Known building dates are in bold text. Non-bold text denotes first known date. Iron windpumps are outside the scope of this list unless listed on the National Register of Historic Places.

Sources

 
Unless stated otherwise, the source for all entries is the Windmill World website.

See also
Wind power in Rhode Island

References

 01
Windmills in the United States
United States